Jessore Cantonment High School is a school in Jessore District, Bangladesh situated at Jessore Cantonment. It has about 1000 students. 

High schools in Bangladesh
Education in Jessore District